Arthur John Iontton (born 16 December 2000) is an English professional footballer who plays as a midfielder for Southern League Premier Division South club Hendon.

Early life
Born in Enfield, Greater London, Iontton attended Winchmore School.

Career

Stevenage
Iontton joined Stevenage at the age of ten and progressed through the club's youth academy. He signed a pre-scholarship contract aged 14 after impressing academy coach Darren Sarll. He captained the club's under-16 team and played several times for the under-18 team during the 2016–17 season, subsequently signing a two-year academy scholarship with the Hertfordshire club on 22 June 2017. Whilst a first-year scholar, he made his first-team debut for Stevenage in the club's 3–1 League Two victory against Exeter City at Broadhall Way on 28 April 2018, coming on as an 18th-minute substitute in the match. He signed his first professional contract with Stevenage on 20 July 2018. Iontton was named as League Two Apprentice of the Year for the 2018–19 season at the EFL Awards ceremony on 26 March 2019. He scored his first professional goal in Stevenage's 3–0 home victory against Carlisle United on 13 April 2019. Iontton made 21 appearances during the season, scoring once. 

Having made 11 appearances for Stevenage during the first half of the 2019–20 season, Iontton joined National League South club Braintree Town on a one-month loan agreement on 24 February 2020. He made four appearances during the loan spell. He made four appearances for Stevenage during the 2020–21 season, before being released by the club in May 2021.

King's Lynn Town
Having been a free agent during the opening months of the 2021–22 season, Iontton joined National League club King's Lynn Town on 18 November 2021, signing a contract until the end of the season. Iontton made three appearances during his time at King's Lynn and was released at the end of the 2021–22 season following the club's relegation.

Hendon
Despite initially signing for National League South club Hampton & Richmond Borough on 25 May 2022, Iontton joined Southern League Premier Division South club Hendon on 3 August 2022 before the start of the 2022–23 season.

Career statistics

Honours
Individual
League Two Apprentice of the Year: 2018–19

References

External links

2000 births
Living people
Footballers from the London Borough of Enfield
English footballers
Association football midfielders
Stevenage F.C. players
English Football League players
Braintree Town F.C. players
King's Lynn Town F.C. players
Hampton & Richmond Borough F.C. players
Hendon F.C. players
National League (English football) players